Jenny Lens, MFA, is a Los Angeles native and was one of the first photographers to chronicle the early punk rock scene of New York, Los Angeles, San Francisco and London from August 1976 to June 1980.

Early life
Born and raised in Los Angeles to a Jewish family, Lens grew up loving books and art. She studied Art at the California State University, Northridge earning her Bachelors in Arts, later going on to earn her Masters in Fine Arts at Cal Arts. Not satisfied with contemporary of studies in School Lens pursued studies in art history of the camera and other art movements.

Career
After college Lens found work around Los Angeles, got married all the while getting more education in the form of a Certification in Computer Graphics and an APA Paralegal Certification from the University of California, Los Angeles Extension. With years of unsatisfactory jobs and an equally unfulfilled marriage, Lens divorced. Her friends and supporters encouraged her which helped her regain her love for photography and her passion for the arts.

Lens was one of the first photographers to chronicle the early punk rock scene of New York, L.A., and London, and to talk about her success as a woman in the male-dominated field of rock photography. Many of these photos are featured in her book Punk Pioneers. She photographed  The Ramones’ first direction in 1976, the scene at the Masque in Los Angeles, the Clash in 1980.

References

Living people
People from Los Angeles
Year of birth missing (living people)
Women in punk
Jews in punk rock